Mayday or May Day may refer to:

Common uses
May Day, a traditional spring festival held on or around May 1
May Day or International Workers' Day, an international labor celebration held on May 1
Mayday or m'aidez, a distress signal

Arts and entertainment

Fictional characters
 Sam Malone, nicknamed "Mayday", the main character of the TV series Cheers
 Mayday Parker, the daughter of Spider-Man
 May Day (James Bond), a character in the film A View to a Kill
 Mayday, a clone trooper in the TV series “Star Wars: The Bad Batch”

Film and television
 Mayday (2005 film), an American television film
 Mayday (2021 film), an American film
 Mayday (Canadian TV series), a 2003 documentary series about aviation disasters
 Mayday (British TV series), a 2013 BBC television drama thriller

Games
 Mayday (game), a 1978 board wargame
 Mayday! Deep Space, science fiction video game

Literature
 May Day (play), a comedy play written by George Chapman, first published in 1611
 "May Day" (short story), a 1920 short story by F. Scott Fitzgerald
 May Day, a 1936 novel by John Sommerfield
 Mayday (novel), a 1979 novel by Tom Block and Nelson DeMille
 "Mayday", a short story by William Faulkner renamed Soldiers' Pay,  published in 1926
 The Mediterranean Caper or Mayday!, a 1973 novel by Clive Cussler

Music 
 Mayday (music festival), an electronic music festival

Groups 
 Mayday (American band), an American rock band
 Mayday (Taiwanese band), a Taiwanese rock band
 ¡Mayday!, an American hip hop group
 Derrick May (musician) (born 1963), American electronic musician also known as "Mayday"

Albums 
 May Day (Matt Pryor album), 2012
 May Day (Matthew Ryan album), 1997
 Mayday (Boys Noize album), 2016
 Mayday (Hugh Cornwell album), 1999
 Mayday (King Cobb Steelie album), 2000
 Mayday (Mark Seymour album), 2015
 Mayday (Troop album), 1998
 Mayday, by The Cells, 2006
 Mayday (single album), by Victon, 2020, or its title track

Songs 
 "May Day", by Chumbawamba from Tubthumper
 "May Day", by Dispatch from Silent Steeples
 "May Day!", by Elvis Perkins from Ash Wednesday
 "Mayday" (April song), 2017
 "Mayday" (Bump of Chicken song), 2007
 "Mayday" (Cam song), 2016
 "Mayday" (Lecrae song), 2012
 "Mayday" (Coldrain song), 2019
 "Mayday", by TheFatRat, 2018
 "Mayday", by Dannic & Lucky Date, featuring Harrison
 "Mayday", by The Go! Team from Semicircle
 "Mayday", by The Libertines from I Get Along EP
 "Mayday", by The Player Piano from Satellite
 "Mayday", by Tomahawk from Mit Gas
 "Mayday!!", by Flobots from Fight with Tools

Places 
 May Day, Kansas, United States
 Mayday, Colorado, United States

Other uses 
 May Day (Washington College), a tradition at Washington College in Chestertown, Maryland
 Elly Mayday (1988–2019), stage name of Canadian model Ashley Shandrel Luther
 Mayday feature, a prominent feature of Amazon's Kindle Fire HDX device
 Mayday PAC, a crowd-funded, political action committee (PAC) in the United States
 Mayday Rescue Foundation whose chief activity was running the White Helmets organization
 Mayday Hospital, former name of Croydon University Hospital, south London 
 Prunus padus, or May Day tree

See also 
 The Prince's May Day Network, climate change body in the UK
 Maiday, an English singer-songwriter